I Know a Place is the third and final studio album by American country music artist Davis Daniel. Its only single was its title track, which failed to chart. This was also Daniel's only album for the A&M Records label, which would close its country division shortly after the album's release.

Track listing
"I Know a Place" (Tommy Lee James, Harry Stinson) - 3:35
"I'm Not Listening Anymore" (Debbie Zavitson, Russ Zavitson) - 3:41
"It's Been a Pleasure (Not Knowing You)" (Randy Archer) - 3:33
"Better Half of My Heart" (Davis Daniel, Tom Laffey, Elbert West) - 3:18
"What I Wouldn't Give" (J.P. Pennington, Troy Seals) - 3:37
"Ruth Ann" (Jimmy Alan Stewart, Al Carmichael, Gary Griffin) - 3:30
"My Heart's Not in It" (Monty Powell, Debi Cochran, John Paul Daniel) - 3:14
"Beer and Money" (D. Daniel, Chris Paul) - 2:50
"From Where I Stand" (Freddy Weller, Ricky John Holt) - 3:24
"Here's Lookin' at You" (D. Daniel, Tom Laffey) - 3:35

Personnel
Eddie Bayers - drums
Joe Chemay - bass guitar
Dan Dugmore - electric guitar, steel guitar
Larry Franklin - fiddle, mandolin
Paul Franklin - steel guitar
John Hobbs - synthesiser, piano, clavinet, wah-wah clavinet
Dann Huff - bass guitar, 6-string bass guitar, electric guitar, gut string guitar
Paul Leim - drums
Anthony Martin - synthesizer, wah-wah technician, background vocals
Steve Nathan - synthesizer, piano, Hammond organ
Michael Rhodes - bass guitar
John Wesley Ryles - background vocals
Russell Terrell - background vocals
Billy Joe Walker, Jr. - acoustic guitar, electric guitar
Biff Watson - acoustic guitar
Dennis Wilson - background vocals
Curtis Young - background vocals

References

1996 albums
A&M Records albums
Davis Daniel albums
Albums produced by Harold Shedd